Grover Lewis (1895 – death date unknown) was an American Negro league third baseman in the 1920s.

A native of Tulsa, Oklahoma, Lewis played for the Homestead Grays in 1928. In five recorded games, he posted five hits in 18 plate appearances.

References

External links
Baseball statistics and player information from Baseball-Reference Black Baseball Stats and Seamheads

1895 births
Year of death missing
Place of death missing
Homestead Grays players
Baseball third basemen
Baseball players from Oklahoma
Sportspeople from Tulsa, Oklahoma